1-Dotriacontanol is a fatty alcohol with 32 carbon atoms.  It has been found in Prosopis glandulosa and Euphorbia granulata.

References

Fatty alcohols
Alkanols